Caher or Caher East Top at , is the third-highest peak in Ireland, on the Irish Arderin and Vandeleur-Lynam classifications. It is part of the MacGillycuddy's Reeks in County Kerry.

Geography 

Caher is Ireland's third-highest peak.

Caher is often climbed as part of the Coomloughra Horseshoe, which takes 6–8 hours and is described as "one of Ireland’s classic ridge walks".  It takes in the circuit of neighbouring peaks of Caher West Top, Carrauntoohil, The Bones, Beenkeragh, and Skregmore.  On Caher's western slopes is the townland of Derrynafeana.

Climbers refer to the narrow path that runs along the top of Caher West Top and neighboring Caher, as the Caher Ridge.

Caher is the 200th–highest mountain in Britain and Ireland on the Simm classification. Caher is regarded by the Scottish Mountaineering Club ("SMC") as one of 34 Furths, which is a mountain above  in elevation, and meets the other SMC criteria for a Munro (e.g. "sufficient separation"), but which is outside of (or furth) Scotland; which is why Caher is sometimes referred to as one of the 13 Irish Munros. Caher's prominence qualifies it to meet the Arderin classification, and the British Isles Simm and Hewitt classifications.

See also 

 Lists of mountains in Ireland
 List of mountains of the British Isles by height
 List of Furth mountains in the British Isles

References

External links
MountainViews: The Irish Mountain Website, Caher
MountainViews: Irish Online Mountain Database
The Database of British and Irish Hills , the largest database of British Isles mountains ("DoBIH")
Hill Bagging UK & Ireland, the searchable interface for the DoBIH
Ordnance Survey Ireland ("OSI") Online Map Viewer
Logainm: Placenames Database of Ireland

Mountains and hills of County Kerry
Furths
One-thousanders of Ireland